Robert Alan Goldberg (born August 16, 1949) is an American historian. He teaches at the University of Utah and has written several books as well as articles and papers.

Goldberg was born in New York City on August 16, 1949. He studied history at Arizona State University, and completed a doctorate in history at the University of Wisconsin–Madison. He began teaching in 1977 as an assistant history professor at the University of Texas at San Antonio. The University of Utah, where he has taught since 1980, has a collection of his papers.

In 2019, he sought the removal of a swastika from a German P.O.W.'s gravemarker in Utah.

Elliott West described his book on the rise an fall of the Ku Klux Klan in Colorado as sophisticated and well written noting it uses case studies to cover the subject. Publishers Weekly described his book on Barry Goldwater as well balanced and solid. A review in the Great Plains Quarterly describes his book on the Colorado Klan an interesting profile with fascinating detail.

He has also written about social movements conspiracies, Barry Goldwater, and Jewish farmers in Clarion, Utah and the American West.

Bibliography
Enemies Within: The Culture of Conspiracy in Modern America, Yale University Press (2001)
American views : documents in American history (1998)
Barry Goldwater, Yale University Press (1995)
Grassroots Resistance: Social Movements in Twentieth Century America (1991)
Back to the Soil: The Jewish Farmers of Clarion, Utah, and Their World (1986)
Shooting in the dark : recovering the Jewish farmers of an American Zion (1983)
Hooded Empire: The Ku Klux Klan in Colorado (1977)

References

1949 births
Living people
Historians from New York (state)
20th-century American historians
American male non-fiction writers
21st-century American historians
20th-century American male writers
Writers from New York City
University of Utah faculty
21st-century American male writers
University of Wisconsin–Madison College of Letters and Science alumni
University of Texas at San Antonio faculty